The 2022 Barrie municipal election was a municipal election held on October 24, 2022, to elect the mayor of Barrie, Barrie City Councillors and the Simcoe County District School Board, Simcoe Muskoka Catholic District School Board, Conseil scolaire catholique MonAvenir and Conseil scolaire Viamonde members. The election was held on the same day as elections in every other municipality in Ontario.

The candidates registered to run for Barrie City Council are as follows:

Mayor
Incumbent mayor Jeff Lehman ran in the 2022 Ontario general election for the Ontario Liberal Party in Barrie—Springwater—Oro-Medonte, losing to Progressive Conservative Doug Downey. Running to replace him is Barry Ward, a 22-year veteran of Barrie City Council; former Conservative MP Alex Nuttall; former Simcoe County Warden, mayor of Penetanguishene and Simcoe North Liberal candidate in the 2018 Ontario general election, Gerry Marshall; and Ward 10 councillor Mike McCann. City councillor Natalie Harris had also announced she was running, but dropped out.

City Council

Ward 1

Ward 2

Ward 3

Ward 4

Ward 5

Ward 6

Ward 7

Ward 8

Ward 9

Ward 10

References

Barrie
Municipal government of Barrie